Reese Wynans (born November 28, 1947) is an American keyboard player, who has done session work and has been a member of Double Trouble and progressive rock band Captain Beyond.  In 2015, he was inducted into the Rock and Roll Hall of Fame as a member of Double Trouble.

Personal life
Wynans grew up in Sarasota, Florida, United States, during the 1950s. Wynans and his six siblings began taking piano lessons at early ages, but he was the only one who "really loved playing." .

Musical career
Wynans was a member of the Second Coming, which from November, 1968 to March, 1969 included two future and founding members of The Allman Brothers Band: guitarist Dickey Betts and bassist Berry Oakley. Other band members were Dale Betts, Larry Reinhardt, and John Meeks. Wynans was involved in the initial jam session with Duane Allman, Betts, Oakley, Butch Trucks, and Jaimoe that led to the formation of the Allman Brothers Band, but was eased aside in favor of vocalist Gregg Allman, as founder Duane Allman did not want two keyboardists, two guitarists, and two drummers all in the same band.

In 1973 he played with Captain Beyond and was on the album Sufficiently Breathless. He quit after just one show with the band, later explaining, "Captain Beyond was a great band to play with, but from the management side it was terribly organized... I was very poor at that time, living in somebody´s else garage, so I needed to work and had to quit."
In 1975 he relocated to Austin, TX to join the Jerry Jeff Walker band. They recorded several albums and toured the US extensively. other band members were Dave Perkins, Bobby Rambo, Leo Lablanc, Tomas Ramirez, Ron Cobb, and Fred Krc.
Wynans also played with The Explosives along with Fred Krc, Waller Collie, and Cam King.
In 1980 he joined the Delbert McClinton band. Other band members were Billy Sanders, James Pennebaker, Larry Lange, Robert Harwell, Ernie Durawa, Roddy Colona and others. He also played piano on many of the tracks on Carole King's albums Touch the Sky and One to One and appears on her vhs recording of the same name.

1985–1990: Stevie Ray Vaughan & Double Trouble
Wynans joined Stevie Ray Vaughan and Double Trouble in 1985, playing keyboards on Soul to Soul and In Step. Wynans performed with the group until Vaughan's death in 1990.

After Vaughan's death, Wynans joined the touring bands of Joe Ely and Lee Roy Parnell.

1992–present
Since moving to Nashville, Tennessee, in 1992, Wynans has played keyboards for a number of country artists including Brooks & Dunn, Trisha Yearwood, Martina McBride, and Hank Williams Jr. Wynans has also played for blues artists Buddy Guy, John Mayall, Kenny Wayne Shepherd, Colin James, Ana Popovic, Dudley Taft, Eli Cook, and Los Lonely Boys.

Wynans performed on six of the 13 songs on The Nashville Sessions, a 1999 album released by Colorado jamband Leftover Salmon. The album featured many musical collaborations, with Wynans contributions coming on songs featuring musicians such as Béla Fleck, Jerry Douglas, and Randy Scruggs.

In 2006, Wynans contributed B3 organ to two songs on the self-titled album from Black Stone Cherry.

Wynans frequently performs live at 3rd & Lindsley Bar and Grill in Nashville, with a number of established local bands, usually consisting of Nashville session musicians.

In late 2014 and early 2015, Wynans was inducted into the Musician's Hall of Fame, Austin City Limits, and the Rock and Roll Hall of Fame all as a part of Stevie Ray Vaughan & Double Trouble.

In 2015, he became the touring keyboard player for blues rock guitarist Joe Bonamassa. Wynans had previously played keyboards on Bonamassa's 2014 album Different Shades of Blue and his "Muddy Wolf" tour, where Bonamassa played songs originally recorded by Muddy Waters and Howlin' Wolf. Wynans appeared with Bonamassa on his winter 2016 tour and featured on his album Blues of Desperation.

In March 2019, his album, Reese Wynans And Friends: Sweet Release, spent two weeks at number 2 in the US Billboard Blues Albums Chart.

In March 2020 Wynans came full circle, replacing the late Gregg Allman on organ for the special The Brothers 50 celebratory concert, that marked 50 years since the formation of the Allman Brothers Band, at Madison Square Garden.

Equipment used
 Hammond B3 and Leslie 142
Wurlitzer 200A
Roland RD800
Roland Juno 106
Nord Stage 2

References

External links

Double Trouble (band) members
American organists
American male organists
20th-century American keyboardists
Living people
People from Sarasota, Florida
Guitarists from Florida
Captain Beyond members
1947 births
20th-century American guitarists
21st-century organists
20th-century American male musicians
21st-century American male musicians
21st-century American keyboardists
Provogue Records artists